Gerasa (Judaea) was an ancient Jewish town mentioned by the historian Josephus (The Jewish War, 4.9.1) as being sacked by the Imperial Roman army under Lucius Annius during the First Jewish-Roman War.

Background and early history
In the beginning of the First Jewish-Roman War, around 66 CE, a place called Gerasa (Ǧeraš), which, according to Josephus, is also the name of the hometown of Simon bar Kokhba, was overrun by the troops of Vespasian, under the command of Lucius Annius, who after taking the town, slew of its able-bodied men and took captive their wives and children. Afterwards, the Roman soldiers with their auxiliaries proceeded to set fire to their houses and to the houses in the adjoining villages, until war had engulfed the entire hill country. Josephus does not specify its location, but later authors, like Jacob N. Simchoni (1884-1926) (q.v. in Hebrew), has specified that it was in Judaea.

Identification 

Several attempts have been made to identify the Gerasa of Judea, the vast majority of scholars concurring that the ancient site is not to be confused with Gerasa (Jarash) of Transjordan, but with a site in Judea proper.

Khirbet Jurish (Judea) 

()

Khirbet Jurish is the most recent contender for the 1st-century town of Gerasa mentioned by Josephus.  Archaeologists Boaz Zissu and Ze'ev Safrai who have studied the various options have both concluded that the site is to be identified with Khirbet Jurish which once stood along the ancient Roman road from Jerusalem to Beit Gubrin, and which is now protected by the Israel Nature and Parks Authority. The ruins of the site presently stand on a hill to the west of Tzur Hadassa, on Har Kitron.

The ruin lay adjacent to the old Jerusalem-Beit Gubrin Roman road, and was visited by PEF explorers, Conder and Kitchener. Three or four ritual immersion baths (miqva'ot) have been discovered on the site, attesting to it being an ancient Jewish settlement. The site also contains a large bottle-shaped cistern, with a depth of about 6 meters, and a bottom measuring 4.3 x 4.7 meters. Potsherds found on the site have been dated back to the Hellenistic, early Roman, and Byzantine periods. On the western slope of the ruin are five rock-carved sepulchres, attesting to the site's antiquity.

Jarash Judea 

()

Jarash, a former Palestinian village situated 3.5 km. south of Hartuv, was suggested by Isaiah Press as meeting the description of Josephus' Gerasa in Judea. It appears to have been a farmstead during the Second Temple period. Even so, the area is notably smaller than the previously mentioned site.

Gezer 

()

Jacob N. Simchoni noted how others (Schlatter, 1913: 39; Nestle, 90) had suggested that an error may have befallen the copyist of the Josephus manuscript and that Gerasa should perhaps be read as Gezer. This view was also adopted by author, M.L. Fischer. Safrai and Klein, however, reject this opinion, saying that this was highly unlikely, since Gezer had already been subdued prior to the capture of Gerasa (ibid. 4.9.1), and that a Roman camp was stationed in Emmaus (near Gezer).

Places outside of Judaea proper

Jurish (Samaria) 

()

Jurish was long thought to be the birthplace of Simon Bar-Giora, and the Jewish stronghold taken by the Romans under Lucius Annius, during Vespasian's military campaign to encircle Jerusalem and to make the people's escape into other regions more difficult. Those who supported this view were Shalem (1940), Avi-Yonah (1976),  Yoram Tsafrir and co-editors (1994), and Israel Finkelstein  (1997), among others. Safrai (1980/81) and  Zissu (2007) have argued, from the sequence  of events, that the toparchy of Akrabat (Acrabatenne) and the region adjoining thereto (i.e. Jurish of Samaria) were subdued by the Romans about one year after Vespasian's forces completed the encirclement of Jerusalem and had erected citadels in Jericho and in Adida, and had destroyed Gerasa in Judea, based on the timeline of these events in Josephus, The Jewish War 4:487 and 4:550–551.

Jerash (Decapolis) 

()

The site Jerash in Transjordan (Gerasa) is often mentioned in the writings of Josephus. The recent debate by scholars, however, does not concern those references, but rather one reference in Josephus (The Jewish War 4.9.1) and where this Gerasa was thought to be of strategic importance, and that its capture deemed necessary by the Romans to quell the revolt in Jerusalem. Josephus' reference to this Gerasa has intrigued many scholars. H. St. J. Thackeray, translator and editor of Josephus' The Jewish War (4.9.1), and John Kitto, have both thought that this Gerasa is none other than the site Jerash in Transjordan.

Historical geographers have argued against Thackeray's view, claiming that Jerash in Transjordan was a Greek city on the side of the Romans, and even if the Jews had taken possession of Gerasa and expelled the Greeks, it leaves unexplained why Annius destroyed the city and also devastated the surrounding area - in the area of the Decapolis which was hardly Jewish; in fact, the excavations there have revealed no destruction at the time of the Jewish uprising. Samuel Klein takes the argument further, writing "Gerasa. The Jewish War 4.9.1. They have already made it known, quite consummately, that it is impossible to say that his intention here is to the city Gerasa which is in Transjordan. For this reason, some have sought to make different emendations [to the original text]: such as by changing the word to read 'Gazara', that is to say, 'Gezer,' etc. However, these same people who assay to 'correct' the text do not ask themselves what need was there for them (i.e. the Roman army) to capture Gezer in the Shefelah in order to shut-off Jerusalem from all sides? Hadn't they already captured the mountain passes, with Emmaus in the West!?"

See also

References

Bibliography


 

, 
, s.v. War 4.9.1 (4.487) (Loeb Classical Library)

External links
Survey of Western Palestine, Map 15:    IAA, Wikimedia commons 
Survey of Western Palestine, Map 17:    IAA, Wikimedia commons

Ancient villages in Israel
Former populated places in Israel
Ancient Jewish history
Judea (Roman province)
Historic Jewish communities
60s disestablishments in the Roman Empire